Zodarion ruffoi is a spider species found in France and Italy.

See also 
 List of Zodariidae species

References

External links 

ruffoi
Spiders of Europe
Spiders described in 1951